Nabi Dar (also Romanized as Nabī Dar; also known as Bī Dar) is a village in Pol-e Doab Rural District, Zalian District, Shazand County, Markazi Province, Iran. At the 2006 census, its population was 118, in 24 families.

References 

Populated places in Shazand County